Galyan's Trading Company was an American sporting goods chain. It was founded in Plainfield, Indiana.

The store began in 1946 as a grocery store, founded by Albert and Naomi Galyan. By the 1960s, the Galyans began selling sporting goods instead. The chain was purchased in 1995 by The Limited. At the time, the chain consisted of only five stores, but grew to 20 by 1999 when The Limited sold 60% of the company to the investment firm of Freeman, Spogli & Company. The company became a publicly traded company when it released its IPO on NASDAQ in 2001. Many of the stores featured rock climbing walls, golf simulators, and archery ranges.

By 2004, Galyan's had 47 stores in 21 states. That same year, the chain was acquired by Dick's Sporting Goods.

References

External links 
  (Archive)

Defunct companies based in Indiana
American companies established in 1946
Retail companies established in 1946
Retail companies disestablished in 2004
Sporting goods retailers of the United States
Defunct retail companies of the United States
1946 establishments in Indiana
1995 mergers and acquisitions
2004 mergers and acquisitions
2001 initial public offerings
Companies formerly listed on the Nasdaq